Utterley is the name of the small 
fictional town in Lancashire, England that was the main setting for the 1980s and 1990s Granada TV series Brass.

Utterley was portrayed as a typical Lancastrian mining and mill town in the 1930s.

The town was controlled by Bradley Hardacre who had risen from a childhood spent in the town's workhouse (which later became the Cottage Hospital) to owning through his company Hardacre International most of the town's industry (mine, mill, munitions factory, shipyard, crutch factory and aircraft factory) and also it would appear all or at least most of the property in the town.

The Hardacres lived in a mansion (known as High Haddom Hall) on a hill overlooking the town whereas most of the town's population lived in back to back terraced housing.

Utterley lay in the fictional valley of Swarfdale or Swarfside with both the River Swarf and the Utterley canal flowing through the town.

The nearest other town was the equally fictional Bishops Tippings which was hinted at being larger than Utterley.

Agnes Fairchild (one of many mistresses of Bradley Hardacre) became MP for Utterley in 1936 representing the Labour party.

Fictional populated places in England